Beaubois or de Beaubois is a French surname.  Notable people with this name include:

Rodrigue Beaubois (born 1988), French basketball player 
Nicolas-Ignace de Beaubois (1689–1770), French-Canadian priest and missionary

See also
Beau Bois, Newfoundland and Labrador, a postal office and fishing settlement in 1911

French-language surnames